African Entertainment Awards USA is an annual accolade event consisting of mostly music awards

 African Entertainment Awards may also refer to:

 African Entertainment Awards (Canada), an annual accolade event founded in 2011